Fernando Senderos (born 3 March 1950) is a Mexican equestrian. He competed at the 1976 Summer Olympics and the 1984 Summer Olympics.

References

1950 births
Living people
Mexican male equestrians
Olympic equestrians of Mexico
Equestrians at the 1976 Summer Olympics
Equestrians at the 1984 Summer Olympics
Pan American Games medalists in equestrian
Pan American Games gold medalists for Mexico
Pan American Games silver medalists for Mexico
Pan American Games bronze medalists for Mexico
Equestrians at the 1975 Pan American Games
Equestrians at the 1979 Pan American Games
Place of birth missing (living people)
Medalists at the 1975 Pan American Games
Medalists at the 1979 Pan American Games